Barbara Hotham Iglewski (born 1938) is an American microbiologist. She is director of international programs at the University of Rochester Medical Center where she is a professor of microbiology and immunology.

Early life and education
Barbara Hotham Iglewski was born in 1938. Her father was a country physician and she would accompany him on house calls during her youth. She attended Allegheny College, earning a B.S. in biology in 1960. She then studied microbiology at Pennsylvania State University, earning her M.S. in 1962 and her Ph.D. in 1964.

Iglewski instructed at Oregon Health and Science University School of Medicine before she was hired as a professor by the University of Rochester Medical Center. She was the first woman to chair a department at the University of Rochester School of Medicine and Dentistry, heading the department of microbiology and immunology from 1986 to 2009. From 1995 to 1998 she was the vice provost for research and graduate education.

Research
Iglewski's research has centered on the pathogenesis of the Pseudomonas aeruginosa bacterium. She discovered that a type I quorum sensing system globally regulated virulence in a human pathogen. She has discovered exoenzymes and toxins including exo S, a type 3 secreted Pseudomonas toxin. She is well known for describing the molecular mechanism of action of Pseudomonas toxin A.

Her work with Peter Greenberg demonstrated that gram-negative bacteria produce AHL signals that control processes such as biofilm formation in neighboring cells of the same species.

She currently studies the regulation of biofilm development and virulence in Pseudomonas aeruginosa.

Iglewski has published more than 150 research papers and book chapters. She holds seven patents. She has been recognized by the Institute for Scientific Information as a highly cited researcher.

Awards and honors
In 1987, Iglewski was made an Honorary Lifetime Member of Graduate Women in Science, formerly Sigma Delta Epsilon for research in microbiology and Immunology.

Iglewski became a fellow of the American Academy of Microbiology in 1986. She was president of the American Society for Microbiology (ASM) from 1987 to 1988. She chaired ASM's publications board from 1990 to 1999. She received the Arthur Kornberg Research Award in 1999 and the Susan B. Anthony Lifetime Achievement Award in 2001. The University of Rochester's School of Medicine and Dentistry awarded her its Lifetime Mentoring Award in 2009.

She was inducted into the National Women's Hall of Fame in 2015.

Personal life
Iglewski lives in Gorham, New York.

References

1938 births
Living people
Allegheny College alumni
American bacteriologists
Oregon Health & Science University faculty
Eberly College of Science alumni
People from Gorham, New York
University of Rochester faculty
Women microbiologists
Scientists from New York (state)